Jorge Andrés Mendoza Uza (born August 16, 1989), known as Andrés Mendoza, is an Ecuadorian footballer who plays for CD El Nacional.

Career
Andrés Mendoza began his career with Club 9 de Octubre in 2006 and thereafter joined Academia Alfaro Moreno in 2007. In 2008, he joined Independiente del Valle making his professional debut with the club that same season. The following season, top Ecuadorian club Barcelona SC acquired Mendoza and loaned him to LDU Portoviejo in the Ecuadorian Serie B. In his one season with Portoviejo, Mendoza made 27 appearances for the club. The following season, he was loaned to Aucas but never made an appearance for the first team. In 2012 Universidad Católica purchased Mendoza's rights and in his first year he helped the club win promotion to the top flight as 2012 Ecuadorian Serie B champions.

In September 2014, Mendoza was sold to Deportivo Maldonado in Uruguay. In his short stay with Deportivo Mendoza appeared in 11 league matches for the Rojiverde. On January 5, 2015, it was announced that Mendoza was joining Major League Soccer club New York City FC.

Notes

References

External links
 
 Jorge Andres Mendoza Uza at the Ecuadorian Football Federation
 

1989 births
Living people
Sportspeople from Guayaquil
Ecuadorian footballers
Association football defenders
C.S.D. Independiente del Valle footballers
Barcelona S.C. footballers
L.D.U. Portoviejo footballers
S.D. Aucas footballers
C.D. Universidad Católica del Ecuador footballers
Deportivo Maldonado players
New York City FC players
Wilmington Hammerheads FC players
L.D.U. Quito footballers
FC Juárez footballers
C.D. Clan Juvenil footballers
Ecuadorian expatriate footballers
Expatriate footballers in Uruguay
Expatriate soccer players in the United States
USL Championship players